Viola pedata, the birdsfoot violet, bird's-foot violet, or mountain pansy, is a violet native to sandy areas in central and eastern North America.

Varieties
Two primary color forms exist, Viola pedata var. lineariloba ("concolor"), which is a solid pink-lilac-lavender color, and var. pedata ("bicolor"), in which the superior petals are a deep red-purple and the lateral and interior petals are similar to the concolor variety.  Less common is Viola pedata var. linearloba forma alba, which is a white flowered form.

Cultivation
Birdsfoot violet favors well drained, acidic soils in full to partial sun environments.  It is difficult to cultivate in typical garden environments because it does not tolerate rich, organic garden soils and excess moisture.

Gallery

References

External links

 
 Kemper Center for Home Gardening, Missouri Botanical Garden
 
 
 
 
 Ontario Wildflowers
 Robert W. Freckmann Herbarium, University of Wisconsin Stevens Point
 Plant Fact Sheet, North Carolina Cooperative Extension
 Chesapeake Bay Watershed Natives
 Plant of the Week, Celebrating Wildflowers, US Forest Service
 
 Bioimages
 Viola Pedata Faces (variation in flower color)

pedata
Flora of the Eastern United States
Plants described in 1753
Taxa named by Carl Linnaeus